Brian Ratcliffe Eley (born 6 July 1946) is a former British Chess Champion. He is wanted by the British police on suspicion of sexual offences against underage boys, and has been a fugitive since 1991.

Chess

Brian Eley belonged to the wave of talented chess masters who came to the fore in Britain in the 1970s, after the dominance of Jonathan Penrose ended—a group that included Raymond Keene, William Hartston, George Botterill, Robert Bellin and others.

He took part in domestic chess tournaments, was a chess coach and gave simultaneous exhibitions. For a period around 1971, he wrote an infrequent chess column in the weekly Morning Telegraph of Sheffield. He ran his own chess retail business, supplying books, chess sets, scorebooks and similar items.

In a major upset, Eley won the 1972 British Chess Championship, held in Brighton. Eley's peak FIDE rating of 2350 in 1974 would qualify him for the title of FIDE Master (FM); however, the FM title had not yet been introduced and he never applied for the title.

Arrest and disappearance
In 1979, James Plaskett, who went on to become a grandmaster and British champion,  reported to David Anderton, the then president of the British Chess Federation (BCF), incidents of "misconduct" by Eley. The following year, Eley was dismissed from the position of England Team Manager after an unrelated incident. As a BCF-registered coach, Eley continued to teach juniors into the late 1980s.

In July 1991, Eley was arrested at his South Yorkshire home on suspicion of sexually abusing an underage male he had once coached. He was released on bail. Although not charged at the time, Eley jumped bail approximately one month after his arrest, and disappeared. He was subsequently charged with more than 30 offences of a similar nature and remains a fugitive, wanted by the British police and Interpol.

Former British Chess Champion GM John Nunn relates in his autobiography that "Brian Eley achieved notoriety by absconding while on police bail relating to an investigation into paedophile activities."

Subsequently, there have been numerous unconfirmed reports of sightings of Eley in various places, mostly in Amsterdam, but his whereabouts remain unknown. John Nunn has remarked that Eley "became the only British Chess Champion...to appear on the television programme Crimewatch."

See also
List of fugitives from justice who disappeared

References

External links
 
Interpol official website

1946 births
English chess players
Fugitives wanted by the United Kingdom
Fugitives wanted on sex crime charges
Living people